Thomas Wallace, 1st Baron Wallace, PC DCL FRSE (1768 – 23 February 1844) was an English politician holding multiple key roles in the government.

Early life
Wallace was born at Brampton in 1768, the son of James Wallace (1729–1783), a barrister who served as Solicitor General for England and Wales and as Attorney General to George III, and his wife, Elizabeth Simpson, the only daughter and sole heiress of Thomas Simpson Esq., of Carleton Hall, Cumberland.

He was educated at Eton College from 1777 to 1784. He then studied at Christ Church at Oxford University, graduating MA in 1790.

Following the death of his father in 1783, he inherited (at age 15) Carleton Hall, which lies near Penrith, Cumbria.

In 1793 he was elected a Fellow of the Royal Society of Edinburgh. His proposers were Andrew Dalzell, Henry Brougham and Alexander Fraser Tytler.

He sold the Carleton estate in 1828 to John Cowper. He then acquired Featherstone Castle near Haltwhistle, Northumberland and remodelled it in the 1830s to a Gothic style.

Political career
Wallace was a Member of Parliament (MP) for Grampound from 1790 to 1796, for Penryn from 1796 to 1802, for Hindon from 1802 to 1806, for Shaftesbury from 1807 to 1812, for Weymouth from 1812 to 1813, for Cockermouth from 1813 to 1818 and again for Weymouth from 1818 to 1828.

He was Lord of the Admiralty from 1797 to 1800.

He was appointed a Privy Counsellor in 1801 and ennobled as Baron Wallace, of Knaresdale in the County of Northumberland, on 2 February 1828.

He was a member of the Board of Control from 1807 to 1816 (responsible for overseeing the British East India Company), and Vice-President of the Board of Trade from 1818 to 1823. From 1823 to 1827 he was Master of the Mint.

Personal life
In 1814 Baron Wallace, aged 46, married Lady Jane Hope (1766-1829), Viscountess Melville (widow of Henry Dundas, 1st Viscount Melville), daughter of John Hope, 2nd Earl of Hopetoun.  Lady Jane died in June 1829.  Lady Jane was then 48 and well beyond child-bearing years, even had she been able (she had no children by her first marriage).

Lord Wallace survived her by 15 years and died at Featherstone on 23 February 1844.  Having no children, the barony died with him.

Arms

References

Sources

External links 
 
 

1768 births
1844 deaths
People educated at Eton College
Alumni of Christ Church, Oxford
Wallace, Thomas Wallace, 1st Baron Wallace
Members of the Parliament of Great Britain for constituencies in Cornwall
Members of the Parliament of Great Britain for English constituencies
British MPs 1790–1796
British MPs 1796–1800
Members of the Parliament of the United Kingdom for constituencies in Cornwall
Members of the Parliament of the United Kingdom for English constituencies
UK MPs 1801–1802
UK MPs 1802–1806
UK MPs 1807–1812
UK MPs 1812–1818
UK MPs 1818–1820
UK MPs 1820–1826
UK MPs 1826–1830
UK MPs who were granted peerages
Members of the Privy Council of the United Kingdom
Peers of the United Kingdom created by George IV
Lords of the Admiralty